Allantide (meaning first day of winter, or Nos Kalan Gwav, meaning eve of the first day of winter and Dy' Halan Gwav, meaning day of the first day of winter), also known as Saint Allan's Day or the Feast of Saint Allan, is a Cornish festival that was traditionally celebrated on the night of 31 October, as well as the following day time, and known elsewhere as Allhallowtide. The festival in Cornwall is the liturgical feast day of St Allan (also spelled St Allen or St Arlan), who was the bishop of Quimper in the sixth century. As such, Allantide is also known as Allan Night and Allan Day. The origins of the name Allantide also probably stem from the same sources as Hollantide (Wales and the Isle of Man) and Hallowe'en itself.  

As with the start of the celebration of Allhallowtide in the rest of Christendom, church bells were rung in order to comfort Christian souls in the intermediate state. Another important part of this festival was the giving of Allan apples, large glossy red apples that were highly polished, to family and friends as tokens of good luck. Allan apple markets used to be held throughout West Cornwall in the run up to the feast.

The following is a description of the festival as it was celebrated in Penzance at the turn of the 19th century:

In his book Popular Romances of the West of England, Robert Hunt describes Allantide in St Ives:

There are a number of divination games recorded including the throwing of walnuts in fires to predict the fidelity of partners, and the pouring of molten lead into cold water as a way of predicting the occupation of future husbands, the shape of the solidified lead somehow indicating this.

In some parts of Cornwall "Tindle" fires were lit similar in nature to the Coel Coth (Coel Certh) of Wales.

Before the 20th century the parish feast of St Just in Penwith was known as Allantide.

See also 

Calan Gaeaf - Wales
Dziady
Hop-tu-Naa - Isle of Man
Nickanan Night
St Allen

References 

Cornish culture
October observances
Halloween
Autumn festivals
Festivals in Cornwall
Apples
Cornish festivals
Traditions involving fire
Autumn events in England